TCT Kids is the children's programming division of the Tri-State Christian Television network. The block of religious-themed children's-oriented shows airs Saturday mornings on TCT's primary network feed in order to meet its affiliates' and owned-and-operated stations' federally mandated educational programming requirements.

TCT Kids also runs as a standalone feed from 6:30 a.m. to 7:30 p.m. Eastern Time daily on its Web site. From 7:30 p.m. to 5 a.m., the TCT Kids feed runs public domain films and television series; the remaining time is occupied by young-Earth creationist Ken Ham's daily program Answers in Genesis and a simulcast of TCT's flagship program, TCT Today.

The remaining stations carrying the standalone feed as a digital subchannel had discontinued it by fall 2017, when TCT signed an affiliation deal with the commercial network Light TV.

Programming
Adventures in Odyssey
Another Sommertime Adventure
Answers in Genesis
Arnie's Shack
The Burnnie Show
Capt'n Chuckleberry
Circle Square
Creation's Creatures
Come On Over
Cowboy Dan
Adventures of Donkey Ollie
Deputy Dingle
Dr. Wonder's Workshop
The Fairies
Faithville
Gina D's Kids Club
God Rocks!/God Rocks! Bibletoons
Gospel Bill Show
Hooked on Science
ImagineLand
Joy Junction
KICKS Club
Kids Against Crime
Kids Like You
Kidz Network
Knock Knock Show
Maralee Dawn
Miss Charity's Diner
Quigley's Village
The Reppies
Reptile Experience
Sarah's Stories
Super Simple Science Stuff
Sing God's Word
Superbook
 Swamp Critters
Tween You & Me
VeggieTales
Wize Flix

See also
Smile

External links

TCT Kids Broadcast Schedule
Tri-State Christian Television

Television programming blocks in the United States